The 2014 Barcelona Open Banc Sabadell (also known as the Torneo Godó) is a men's tennis tournament played on outdoor clay courts. It was the 62nd edition of the event and part of the ATP World Tour 500 series of the 2014 ATP World Tour. It took place at the Real Club de Tenis Barcelona in Barcelona, Catalonia, Spain, from April 21 through April 27, 2014.

Points and prize money

Points distribution

Prize money

Singles main-draw entrants

Seeds

1 Rankings as of April 14, 2014.

Other entrants
The following players received wildcards into the main draw:
  Facundo Argüello 
  Roberto Carballés Baena
  Iñigo Cervantes 
  Daniel Gimeno Traver

The following players received entry from the qualifying draw:
  Andreas Beck 
  Marsel İlhan
  Andrey Kuznetsov
  Marc López
  Dominic Thiem 
  Matteo Viola

Withdrawals
Before the tournament
  Pablo Andújar → replaced by  Michał Przysiężny
  Federico Delbonis → replaced by  Albert Ramos
  Richard Gasquet → replaced by  Nikolay Davydenko
  Ivo Karlović → replaced by  Somdev Devvarman
  Juan Mónaco → replaced by  Aleksandr Nedovyesov

Retirements
  Fabio Fognini (right leg injury)
  Philipp Kohlschreiber
  Benoît Paire (knee injury)

Doubles main-draw entrants

Seeds

 Rankings are as of April 14, 2014.

Other entrants
The following pairs received wildcards into the doubles main draw:
  Roberto Bautista Agut /  Albert Montañés 
  Pablo Carreño Busta /  Albert Ramos
The following pair received entry from the qualifying draw:
  Teymuraz Gabashvili /  Mikhail Kukushkin
The following pairs received entry as alternates:
  Somdev Devvarman /  Ante Pavić
  Jesse Huta Galung /  Stéphane Robert

Withdrawals
Before the tournament
  Bob Bryan (shoulder injury)
  Benoît Paire (knee injury)

Retirements
  Marc López (left leg injury)

Champions

Singles

 Kei Nishikori def.  Santiago Giraldo, 6–2, 6–2

Doubles

  Jesse Huta Galung /  Stéphane Robert def.  Daniel Nestor /  Nenad Zimonjić, 6–3, 6–3

References

External links
Official Website

Barcelona Open Banc Sabadell
Barcelona Open (tennis)
Barcelona Open Banco Sabadell